"Set Me on Fire" is the debut single by Bella Ferraro who finished fourth on the fourth season of The X Factor Australia. It was released digitally by Sony Music Australia on 14 December 2012.

Background and release
"Set Me on Fire" was written by Louis Schoorl and Hayley Warner. It would have been Ferraro's winner's single for the fourth season of The X Factor, if she had won the show. However, she finished in fourth place. "Set Me on Fire" was released digitally as her debut single on 14 December 2012. A CD single was also released.

Track listing
CD / digital download
 "Set Me on Fire" – 3:40

Charts

Weekly charts

Release history

References

2012 debut singles
2012 songs
Songs written by Louis Schoorl
Songs written by Hayley Warner